Sarcolipin is a micropeptide protein that in humans is encoded by the SLN gene.

Function 
Sarcoplasmic reticulum Ca2+-ATPases are transmembrane proteins that catalyze the ATP-dependent transport of Ca2+ from the cytosol into the lumen of the sarcoplasmic reticulum in muscle cells. The SLN gene encodes a small transmembrane proteolipid that regulates several sarcoplasmic reticulum Ca2+-ATPases by reducing the accumulation of Ca2+ in the sarcoplasmic reticulum without affecting the rate of ATP hydrolysis.

Ablation of sarcolipin increases atrial Ca2+ transient amplitudes and enhanced atrial contractility. Furthermore, atria from sarcolipin-null mice have blunted response to isoproterenol stimulation, implicating sarcolipin as a mediator of beta-adrenergic responses in atria.

Sarcolipin is an important mediator of muscle based non shivering thermogenesis (NST). It causes the sarcoplasmic reticulum Ca2+-ATPases to stop pumping Ca2+ ions but continue futilely hydrolysing ATP, thus releasing the energy as heat. Sarcolipin mediated heat production is very important for many organisms to maintain a warm body. In mammals thermogenesis by skeletal muscles is complemented by thermogenesis in the brown adipose tissue and beige adipose tissue.  Sarcolipin mediated heat production in contractile muscles helps endothermic fish like the opah heat its body. Some fishes like the billfishes have a specialised brain heater tissue that is derived from muscles that cannot contract but specialise in producing heat using sarcolipin.

Interactions 

SLN (gene) has been shown to interact with PLN and ATP2A1.

References

Further reading